IIR may refer to:

 Institute of International Relations (disambiguation)
 Institute for International Research, a human capital development company acquired by Informa
 International Institute of Refrigeration
 Imaging infrared, in munitions guidance systems
 Indo-Iranian languages
 Infinite impulse response
 Isobutylene isoprene rubber (butyl rubber)